Ptilodon cucullina, the maple prominent, is a moth of the family Notodontidae. The species was first described by Michael Denis and Ignaz Schiffermüller in 1775. It is found in Europe.

The wingspan is 35–40 mm. The moths are on wing from May to July depending on the location.

The larvae feed on Acer campestris and sometimes Acer pseudoplatanus.

External links

Lepidoptera of Belgium
Lepiforum e.V.
De Vlinderstichting 

Notodontidae
Moths of Europe
Taxa named by Michael Denis
Taxa named by Ignaz Schiffermüller